"Off the Ground" is a rock/pop song by Paul McCartney and is from the album from the same name. This was one of McCartney's first songs made using a computer. The video can be seen on the DVD collection, The McCartney Years.  The video was shot by Industrial Light & Magic. Some behind the scenes footage can be seen on the out of print VHS, Movin' On.  The video features "Soggy Noodle", a short acoustic piece played as an intro which can be found as a B-side on the single release.  In the US, it reached number 27 on the Adult Contemporary chart.

The song was played live during The New World Tour that followed the release of the album; however, the song was not included on the live album, Paul Is Live.

Track listings
7" single
 "Off the Ground"
 "Cosmically Conscious"

CD single
 "Off the Ground" – 3:38
 "Cosmically Conscious" – 4:39
 "Style Style" – 5:59
 "Sweet Sweet Memories" – 4:02
 "Soggy Noodle"

Charts

References

Paul McCartney songs
1993 singles
1993 songs
Songs written by Paul McCartney
Song recordings produced by Paul McCartney
Music published by MPL Music Publishing
Song recordings produced by Julian Mendelsohn